Mater Christi College is an independent Roman Catholic secondary school for girls located in the eastern Melbourne suburb of Belgrave, Victoria, Australia.

History
Mother Mary Olivera, Superior General of the Good Samaritan Order of the Catholic Church declared in 1962, “Let’s build a boarding school on top of the hill in Belgrave". Subsequently, the school was founded by the Sisters of the Good Samaritan religious order in 1963 outside Belgrave, overlooking the Dandenong Ranges of Victoria. Six Good Samaritan Sisters initially instructed 62 female students, offering an academic education, "based on the principles of Benedictine values". The site chosen in 1962 consisted of grounds which contained Heathermont, a  guest house.  Sunny Siesta was on the 90 degree turn at the top of Bayview Road and was where the first sisters established their convent in May 1962. A new convent, chapel  and classrooms were opened in 1964.

Although initially envisaged as a small day and boarding school, the rapidly growing population in the eastern suburbs of Melbourne saw Mater Christi College grow, and today there are more than 850 girls enrolled at the college, including students from several Asia-Pacific countries. In 1989, a boarding house was attached to the college. It closed in 2015. An international student program operates at the college, using homestay families to house the girls paired with an on-campus English and preparation program. Mater Christi offers a range of subjects to suit students and is designed so that students undertake studies from all areas of learning at Years 7 to 12. Students are then able to select from a wide range of VCE units.

Facilities
Facilities at Mater Christi College include:
 Full WiFi Campus
 MacBook and iPad Program
 Contemporary learning spaces
 Science Labs
 Library/Learning Commons
 Chapel
 Arts Studios / photography and ceramics
 Technology (textiles) centre
 Two indoor halls with full sized basketball courts
 An outdoor track and field training area 
 Industry standard hospitality / food technology centres
 Outdoor tennis courts
 Dance Studio
 Restaurant/cafe

Notable alumnae

 Renae Hallinan, an Australian and Melbourne Vixens netballer.
 Jane Flemming, former Olympian athlete and Commonwealth medallist, sports media commentator

References

External links
www.materchristi.edu.au (official website)

Girls' schools in Victoria (Australia)
Catholic secondary schools in Melbourne
Educational institutions established in 1963
1963 establishments in Australia
Alliance of Girls' Schools Australasia
Former boarding schools in Australia
Buildings and structures in the Shire of Yarra Ranges